Mert Erdoğdu (born 30 March 1979 in İzmit) is a Turkish chess player with the FIDE title of Grandmaster. He is the 2016 Turkish Chess Champion.

Biography 
Mert Erdoğdu was born on 30 March 1979 in İzmit. He started playing chess while studying at Galatasaray High School. He earned FIDE titles as FIDE Master (FM) in 2001, International Master (IM) in 2003 and Grand Master (GM) in 2017. He is the thirteenth player to become a grandmaster in Turkish chess history. He competed in the Turkish national team at the Chess Olympiad between 2000 and 2009. Erdoğdu won the 2016 Turkish Chess Championship held in Kocaeli.

In 2018, Erdoğdu was appointed by FIDE as the trainer of the El Salvador Women's National Team in the 1600–1800 Elo category at the 43rd Chess Olympiad.

Achievements 
 2nd Mediterranean Individual Championship – Champion
 2016 – Turkish Chess Championship – Champion

References

External links 
 
 
 

1979 births
Living people
Turkish chess players
Chess grandmasters
Galatasaray High School alumni
Chess Olympiad competitors